Bill P. Wielechowski (born December 7, 1967) is an American lawyer serving as a Democratic member of the Alaska Senate representing District K. District K is located in Northeast Anchorage, Alaska. Prior to the 2022 redistricting process, he represented District H from 2013 to 2023. Wielechowski also previously represented District J from 2007 to 2013.

Early life
Wielechowski was born December 7, 1967, in Ridgewood, New Jersey to a Polish-American family (his grandfather immigrated from Kraków in 1910). He attended Seton Hall University earning a Bachelor of Science in business management and finance and graduating magna cum laude. He then attended Seton Hall University School of Law earning his juris doctor in 1992.

After moving to Anchorage, he became a volunteer with the Northeast Community Council, as a Commissioner on the Anchorage Planning & Zoning Commission and as chair of the Creekside Town Center. In 1999 he was the designated chair of the Alaska Workers' Compensation Board.

In 2003, he served on the mayoral transition team for Mark Begich and went on to serve the city as a member of the 2003 Anchorage School District Budget Review Team and the Mayor's Task Force on Obesity and Health. In 2004, he stepped down as designated chair of the Alaska Workers' Compensation Board to become associate general counsel for IBEW Local 1547.

Alaska Senate
In 2006, he was elected to the Alaska Senate to replace retiring Democratic incumbent Gretchen Guess in District J, which included the neighborhoods of Mt. View, Muldoon and Russian Jack in Anchorage. In the 2010 election, he defeated Ron Slepecki winning 58% of the vote to Slepecki's 42%.

He was a majority member of the Senate bi-partisan Working Group from 2007 through 2012. He then joined the Minority Caucus.

In 2013–2014, Senator Wielechowski led an effort to repeal legislation, passed by the legislature in 2013, granting additional tax credits to oil and gas companies. The effort to repeal the legislation was rejected by Alaska voters in 2014.

Committee assignments
In the 2015-2016 legislative session, Wielechowski served as a member of the following standing committees; Judiciary, Resources and State Affairs. He also served on the Special Committee on Federal Overreach, the Joint Committee on Armed Services

References

External links

 Alaska State Legislature - Senator Bill Wielechowski official government website
 Project Vote Smart - Senator Bill P. Wielechowski (AK) profile
 Follow the Money - Bill Wielechowski
 2006 campaign contributions
 Bill Wielechowski at 100 Years of Alaska's Legislature

1967 births
Alaska lawyers
Democratic Party Alaska state senators
American politicians of Polish descent
Living people
Politicians from Anchorage, Alaska
People from Ridgewood, New Jersey
Seton Hall University School of Law alumni
21st-century American politicians
Lawyers from Anchorage, Alaska